The Dhule Municipal Corporation is the governing body of the city of Dhule in the Indian state of Maharashtra. The municipal corporation consists of democratically elected members, is headed by a mayor and administers the city's infrastructure, public services and police. Members from the state's leading various political parties hold elected offices in the corporation. Municipal Corporation mechanism in India was introduced during British Rule with formation of municipal corporation in Madras (Chennai) in 1688, later followed by municipal corporations in Bombay (Mumbai) and Calcutta (Kolkata) by 1762. Dhule Municipal Corporation has been formed with functions to improve the infrastructure of town.

Revenue sources 

The following are the Income sources for the Corporation from the Central and State Government.

Revenue from taxes  
Following is the Tax related revenue for the corporation.

 Property tax.
 Profession tax.
 Entertainment tax.
 Grants from Central and State Government like Goods and Services Tax.
 Advertisement tax.

Revenue from non-tax sources 

Following is the Non Tax related revenue for the corporation.

 Water usage charges.
 Fees from Documentation services.
 Rent received from municipal property.
 Funds from municipal bonds

List of Mayor

List of Deputy Mayor

List of Chairman, Standing Committee

Administration

The Dhule Municipal Corporation is headed by a Municipal Commissioner, generally a senior officer state cadre officer/an IAS officer. The commissioner wields the executive power of the house. A quinquennial election is held to elect corporators to power. The corporators are responsible for overseeing that their constituencies have the basic civic infrastructure in place, and that there is no lacuna on the part of the authorities. The mayor is the head of the house, who is usually from the majority party. All administrative business in the municipal corporation is conducted in Marathi.

Corporation Election 2018

Political Performance in Election 2018

Political Performance in Election 2013

References 

Dhule
Municipal corporations in Maharashtra
2003 establishments in Maharashtra